Villa Beau Site is a historic mansion in Nice, Alpes-Maritimes, France. It was built from 1885 to 1890, and it was designed by architect Sébastien-Marcel Biasini. It has been listed as an official national monument since July 27, 1987.

References

Houses completed in 1890
Monuments historiques of Nice